is a Japanese video game composer and sound director employed by Nintendo.

Works

Notes

References 

Japanese composers
Japanese male composers
Living people
Nintendo people
Japanese sound designers
Video game composers
Place of birth missing (living people)
Year of birth missing (living people)